Ivory Coast (officially Côte d'Ivoire or République de Côte d'Ivoire) is a country in West Africa. 

Ivory Coast may also refer to:
Ivory Coast, 1988 album by jazz artist Bob James
Ivory Coast, another name for the drug Ivory Wave

See also